Gallatin Community Unit School District 7 is a school district covering most of Gallatin County, Illinois.  It operates a single campus, the Gallatin County Educational Complex, also known as Gallatin County School, which is divided into a grade school, junior high school, and high school, between Equality and Junction in Equality Township, Gallatin County, Illinois.

 there were 213 high school students enrolled.

History

Previous schools
The New Haven School was closed in 1973.

Shawneetown High School in new Shawneetown was closed in 1991; students then went to the newly built Gallatin High School.

CUSD 7
The school district was established on July 1, 1987, by the consolidation of North Gallatin Community Unit School District 1, Southeast Gallatin Community Unit School District 2, and Equality Community Unit School District 4.

The educational complex opened in August 1991, taking in students that were at Equality, Ridgway, and Shawneetown.

References

External links
 Gallatin CUSD 7

School districts established in 1987
Gallatin County, Illinois
School districts in Illinois
1987 establishments in Illinois